DJG may refer to:
Duliajan railway station in India, station code
Djanet Inedbirene Airport, Algeria, IATA code